Gilles Motet (born 22 June 1956) is a French scientist in computer science, software engineering and risk management fields. He is now a professor at INSA Toulouse, University of Toulouse. He is the scientific director of La Fondation pour une Culture de Sécurité Industrielle.

Works
A short list of his works:
 Gilles Motet (co-author), ISO 31000 "Risk Management. Principles and guidelines", International Organization for Standardization
 Gilles Motet (co-author), ISO Guide 73, Revision, "Risk management. Vocabulary", International Organization for Standardization
 Gilles Motet, J.-C. Geffroy, Special Issue on Dependable Computing, Theoretical Computer Sciences, vol. 290(2), Elsevier, 2003
 J.-C. Geffroy, Gilles Motet, Design of Dependable Computing Systems, Kluwer Academic Publishers, 2002
 Gilles Motet, A. Marpinard, J.-C. Geffroy, Design of Dependable Ada software, Prentice Hall, 1996

References

External links
 Gilles Motet

1956 births
Living people
French computer scientists